Jacek Rylski (born 22 December 1956) is a Polish rower. He competed in the men's coxed pair event at the 1972 Summer Olympics.

References

1956 births
Living people
Polish male rowers
Olympic rowers of Poland
Rowers at the 1972 Summer Olympics
Rowers from Warsaw